Growth factor receptor inhibitors (growth factor inhibitors, growth factor receptor blockers, growth factor blockers, growth factor receptor antagonists, growth factor antagonists) are drugs that target the growth factor receptors of cells. They interfere with binding of the growth factor to the corresponding growth factor receptors, impeding cell growth and are used medically to treat cancer.

Drugs of this type include those that target the epidermal growth factor receptors of epidermal cells (EGFR inhibitors) and those that target vascular endothelial growth factor receptors (VEGFR inhibitors).

Growth factor receptor inhibitors in cancer treatment and research 

In cancer treatment, growth factor receptor inhibitors have been used to target cancer cells.

In cancer research, growth factor receptor inhibitors have been applied to protect normal cells selectively from the toxic side-effects of chemotherapy targeted against cancer cells.

References

Further reading

External links 
 Growth Factor Plus Reviews at the todayhealthplan.com website
 EGFR inhibitors at the Drugs.com website.
 HER2 inhibitors at the Drugs.com website.
 VEGF/VEGFR inhibitors at the Drugs.com website.
 Cancer growth blockers at the Cancer Research UK website.
 Status of Epidermal Growth Factor Receptor Antagonists in the Biology and Treatment of Cancer at the Journal of Clinical Oncology website.
 Exploiting Cancer Cell Cycling for Selective Protection of Normal Cells at the Cancer Research (Journal) website.

Tyrosine kinase inhibitors
Receptor antagonists
Growth factors